Makhnovka is the name of a village in Ukraine.

Makhnovka can also refer to:

Machnovka (Hasidic dynasty) Hasidic rebbes